Gardanbori-ye Sofla (also Romanized as Gardanborī-ye Soflá; also known as Pā’īn Gardan Borī) is a village in Karipey Rural District, Lalehabad District, Babol County, Mazandaran Province, Iran. At the 2006 census, its population was 306, in 72 families.

References 

Populated places in Babol County